Svein Hatløy (12 May 1940 – 5 July 2015) was a Norwegian architect, professor and founder of the Bergen School of Architecture.

He was born in Årdal, Rogaland. Hatløy was the principal of the Bergen School of Architecture from its foundation in 1986 until August 2007. After his retirement as the school's principal, he still works as professor for the institution. He was educated as an architect at the Norwegian Institute of Technology in 1964 and later studied at the Warsaw Academy of Fine Arts.

He was given the Norwegian National Association of Architects' Honorable Membership in 2001 because of his long work with BAS. He died in 2015.

References

1940 births
2015 deaths
People from Rogaland
Norwegian Institute of Technology alumni
Academic staff of the Bergen School of Architecture
Rectors of universities and colleges in Norway
Academy of Fine Arts in Warsaw alumni